Six Compositions (Quartet) 1984 is an album by the American saxophonist and composer Anthony Braxton, recorded in New York in 1984 and released on the Italian Black Saint label.

Reception 

The AllMusic review awarded the album 4 stars with Scott Yanow observing, "Anthony Braxton (who on this set plays alto, soprano, C-melody sax, clarinet, and flute) met up with his longtime pianist Marilyn Crispell for the first time on this Black Saint release. With bassist John Lindberg and drummer Gerry Hemingway forming what would be (with Mark Dresser in Lindberg's place) a regular group for nearly a decade, his quartet was off to a strong start. Braxton seems quite comfortable playing this complex music." The Penguin Guide to Jazz singled out Crispell's contributions as being particularly effective.

Track listing 
All compositions by Anthony Braxton.
 "Composition No. 114 (+ 108A)" – 7:09
 "Composition No. 110C" – 4:38
 "Composition No. 115" – 6:37
 "Composition No. 110A (+ 108B)" – 4:58
 "Composition No. 110D" – 2:39
 "Composition No. 116" – 9:46

Personnel 
Anthony Braxton – alto saxophone, soprano saxophone, C melody saxophone, clarinet, flute
Marilyn Crispell – piano
John Lindberg – double bass
Gerry Hemingway – percussion

References 

Black Saint/Soul Note albums
Anthony Braxton albums
1984 albums